Dharmokam High School is a secondary school in Sherpur Upazila, Bogra District. It was established in 1991. The school was started with only 14 students. Now there are about 823 students studying here. There are 14 teachers in the school.

References

Schools in Bogra District